WAYC (100.9 FM) is a hot adult contemporary formatted broadcast radio station licensed to Bedford, Pennsylvania, serving Beford and Bedford County in Pennsylvania. WAYC is owned and operated by Cessna Communications, Inc.

References

External links
Star 100.9 Online

AYC
Radio stations established in 1966
1966 establishments in Pennsylvania
Hot adult contemporary radio stations in the United States